Jocelyn Marie "Joss" Orejel Tavares (born 14 November 1996) is a professional footballer who plays as defender for Liga MX Femenil club América. Born in the United States, she represents the Mexico women's national team.

International career
Orejel represented Mexico at the 2012 FIFA U-17 Women's World Cup. She made her senior debut on 20 July 2018 in a friendly match against Trinidad and Tobago.

References

External links
 
 Jocelyn Orejel at StatsFootFeminin.fr 
 

1996 births
Living people
Citizens of Mexico through descent
Mexican women's footballers
Women's association football defenders
Mexico women's international footballers
Liga MX Femenil players
Club Tijuana (women) footballers
Mexican expatriate women's footballers
Mexican expatriate sportspeople in France
Expatriate women's footballers in France
American women's soccer players
Soccer players from California
People from Fountain Valley, California
American sportspeople of Mexican descent
Colorado Buffaloes women's soccer players
American expatriate women's soccer players
American expatriate sportspeople in France